The 2011 UAB Blazers football team represented the University of Alabama at Birmingham in the 2011 NCAA Division I FBS football season. The Blazers, led by fifth year head coach Neil Callaway, played their home games at Legion Field and competed in the East Division of Conference USA. They finished the season 3–9, 3–5 in C-USA play to finish in a tie for fourth place in the East Division.

Head coach Neil Callaway was fired at the end of the season after a five-year record of 18–42.

Schedule

References

UAB
UAB Blazers football seasons
UAB Blazers football